Miss Philippines Earth 2005 was the 5th edition of the Miss Philippines Earth pageant. It was held on May 29, 2005, at the University of the Philippines Theater in Quezon City, Philippines.

The event was broadcast by ABS-CBN Network in the Philippines and The Filipino Channel internationally. Genebelle Raagas became Miss Philippines Earth 2005 at the conclusion of the event and was crowned by Lorraine Schuck, Executive vice president of Carousel Productions. Raagas won against 23 other candidates and became the representative of Philippines in the international Miss Earth 2005 pageant.

Results
Color keys

Special awards
 Best in Evening Gown - #22 Jemay Zacarias
 Best in Swimsuit - #5 Genebelle Raagas
 Miss Talent - #23 Feddilaine Apole
 Miss Photogenic - #4 Antonette Stephanie Yu
 Miss Friendship - #24 Istana Eula Burgos
 Miss Avon Color - #5 Genebelle Raagas
 Pond's Flawless Rosy White Skin - #7 Eizel Jen Nocon

Candidates
The following is the list of the official contestants of Miss Philippines Earth 2005 representing various regions in the Philippines:

See also
:Miss Earth 2005

References

External links
Official Website
Lil' Earth Angels Official Website

2005
2005 beauty pageants
2005 in the Philippines
May 2005 events in the Philippines